Sibraa is a surname. Notable people with the surname include:

 Jim Sibraa (1896–1982), Australian rugby league player
 Kerry Sibraa (born 1937), Australian politician